Daryl McPherson, known as DJ Durel, is an American record producer, recording engineer, and DJ from Cleveland, Ohio. He is the official DJ of Atlanta rap group, Migos.

Career 
In late 2017, Control the Streets, Vol. 1, a compilation album released by Quality Control Music, featured six tracks produced by DJ Durel – more than any other producer features on the 30-track album.

In 2018, Migos released Culture II, crediting DJ Durel and Quavo as executive producers of the album. DJ Durel is listed as a producer on 12 of the 24 songs on the album and as a recording engineer for the entire album.

Durel claims to be the fourth member of Migos in his Instagram bio, despite the group being a self-acknowledged trio.

Discography

Singles

Production discography

2014
Migos – Rich Nigga Timeline

2015
Migos – Yung Rich Nation

2017
Quality Control – Control the Streets Vol. 1

2018
Migos – Culture II
Gucci Mane  featuring Migos and Lil Yachty – "Solitaire"
Lil Yachty – Lil Boat 2
Takeoff - The Last Rocket

2019
Young Thug – So Much Fun

References

Living people
Quality Control artists
African-American record producers
American hip hop DJs
American hip hop record producers
Musicians from Cleveland
American audio engineers
Engineers from Ohio
Year of birth missing (living people)
21st-century African-American people